Spandaryan is a village in the Artik Municipality of the Shirak Province of Armenia. The village was renamed in 1946 in honor of Armenian revolutionary Suren Spandaryan.

Demographics

References 

World Gazetteer: Armenia – World-Gazetteer.com

Populated places in Shirak Province